Coffee substitutes are non-coffee products, usually without caffeine, that are used to imitate coffee. Coffee substitutes can be used for medical, economic and religious reasons, or simply because coffee is not readily available. Roasted grain beverages are common substitutes for coffee.

In World War II, acorns were used to make coffee, as were roasted chicory and grain. Postum, a bran and molasses beverage, also became a popular coffee substitute during this time. During the American Civil War coffee was also scarce in the South:

Coffee substitutes are sometimes used in preparing food and drink served to children, to people who believe that coffee is unhealthy, and to people who avoid caffeine for religious reasons. The Church of Jesus Christ of Latter-day Saints (LDS Church) advises its members to refrain from drinking coffee, as church doctrine interprets a prohibition against "hot drinks" to include coffee in all forms. The Seventh-day Adventist Church regards caffeine as an unhealthful substance, and advises its members to avoid all food and drink containing caffeine, including coffee.

Some Asian culinary traditions include beverages made from roasted grain instead of roasted coffee beans (including barley tea, corn tea, and brown rice tea); these do not substitute for coffee but fill a similar niche as a hot aromatic drink (optionally sweetened).

Ingredients
Grain coffee and other substitutes can be made by roasting or decocting various organic substances.

Some ingredients used include almond, acorn, asparagus, malted barley, beechnut, beetroot, carrot, chicory root, corn, soybeans, cottonseed, dandelion root (see dandelion coffee), fig, roasted garbanzo beans, lupinus, boiled-down molasses, okra seed, pea, persimmon seed, potato peel, rye, sassafras pits, sweet potato, wheat bran.

History
The Native American people of what is now the Southeastern United States brewed a ceremonial drink containing caffeine, "asi", or the "black drink", from the roasted leaves and stems of Ilex vomitoria (Yaupon holly). European colonists adopted this beverage as a coffee-substitute, which they called "cassina".

In Quebec, the seeds of the black locust were historically used as a coffee substitute, before the stem borer decimated populations of the tree.

A coffee substitute from ground, roasted chickpeas was mentioned by a German writer in 1793.

Dandelion coffee is attested as early as the 1830s in North America.

The drink brewed from ground, roasted chicory root has no caffeine, but is dark and tastes much like coffee. It was used as a medicinal tea before coffee was introduced to Europe. Use of chicory as a coffee substitute became widespread in France early in the 19th century due to coffee shortages resulting from the Continental Blockade. It was used during the American Civil War in Louisiana, and remains popular in New Orleans. Chicory mixed with coffee is also popular in South India, and is known as Indian filter coffee.

Postum is an instant type of coffee substitute made from roasted wheat bran, wheat and molasses. It reached its height of popularity in the United States during World War II when coffee was sharply rationed.

Examples 

Roasted grain drinks are prepared from various cereals:
Barleycup is a brand of instant drink made from barley, rye, and chicory and sold in the UK.
Barley tea is an infusion popular across East Asia and sometimes sold as a coffee substitute.
Caffè d'orzo is an espresso-style preparation of roasted barley made in Italy.
Nestlé Caro is another brand of instant drink made of roasted barley, malted barley, chicory, and rye.
Inka is a Polish drink made of rye, barley, chicory and sugar beet.
Postum is an instant wheat bran and molasses drink invented by C. W. Post.
 Infusions or tisanes of other plant material can resemble coffee.
 Dandelion coffee is a tisane of dandelion roots.
 Qishr is drink of coffee husks and spices from Yemen.
 Coffee substitutes can be added to true coffee as an adulterant.
Camp Coffee is a mix of chicory and coffee from the UK, sold since 1876.
Ricoré is a mix of chicory and coffee from France created in 1953, now produced by Nestlé.

Synthetic coffee
In 2021, media outlets reported that the world's first synthetic coffee products have been created by two biotechnology companies, still awaiting regulatory approvals for near-term commercialization. Such products, which can be produced via cellular agriculture in bioreactors and for which multiple companies' R&D have acquired substantial funding, may have equal or similar effects, composition and taste as natural products but use less water, generate less carbon emissions, require less labour and cause no deforestation. Products that are comparable to naturally grown coffee on the chemical molecular level would not be "coffee substitutes" but differ only in their method of production; hence they would be "lab-grown coffee".

Earlier, in 2019, molecular coffee, made from undisclosed plant-based materials and caffeine, was demonstrated after being developed by an American company, Atomo. However, it is unclear how similar the composition is to coffee on a molecular level or in terms of its effects. It was put on a short temporary sale in 2021.

Preparation
Coffee substitutes may be powder, which dissolves in hot water; grounds, which are brewed like coffee; or grains, left whole to be boiled and steeped like tea.

See also

 Brewing (disambiguation)
 East German coffee crisis
 Nechezol
 Ersatz good
 Herbal tea
 List of hot beverages

References

Further reading 
  [28:30]